Sukmajaya is an administrative district in the city of Depok, in West Java province, Indonesia, within the Jakarta metropolitan area. It covers an area of 17.35 km2 and had a population of 232,308 at the 2010 Census; the latest official estimate (as at mid 2018) is 311,379. It is one of the most densely populated areas in Depok. Many housing areas and educational institutions are located in this district. Moreover Depok Dua Tengah and Depok Dua Timur are also located within the district. In addition, Pesona Square shopping mall is located in this district.

History
Sukmajaya was the easternmost district of Depok Administrative City, of which it was established on March 18, 1982, before the inclusion of Cimanggis district in 1999. The district was first inaugurated by the then Minister of Home Affairs, Lt. Gen. Amirmachmud. This was related to the inauguration of Depok as an Administrative City covering Beji District, Sukmajaya District, Pancoran Mas District, Sawangan District and Limo District. Sukmajaya District Office is located at Jalan Merdeka Raya 1 Depok Dua Tengah. Sukmajaya District was established on the basis of Depok City Local Regulation No. 08 of 2007 on District Expansion, which states that the Sukmajaya District is a part of Depok City area.

Administrative villages (Kelurahan)
Sukmajaya is surrounded north by Cimanggis District, south by Cilodong District, west by Pancoran Mas District, east by Tapos District. Sukmajaya consists of 6 Kelurahan namely:
Abadijaya
Bakti Jaya
Cisalak
Mekar Jaya
Sukmajaya
Tirtajaya

See also
 List Postcodes  in Depok (Articles in Indonesian)

References

depok
Populated places in West Java